The Yemenite ambassador in Moscow is the official representative of the Government in Aden to the Government of Russia.

List of ambassadors

South Yemen

List of ambassadors 

Yemen–Russia relations

References

 
Russia
Yemen